Carmen Romero López (born 15 November 1946), is a Spanish politician. From 2009 to 2014, she served as a member of the European Parliament, representing Spain for the Spanish Socialist Workers Party.

References

21st-century women MEPs for Spain
1946 births
Living people
MEPs for Spain 2009–2014
People from Seville
Spanish Socialist Workers' Party MEPs
Spouses of prime ministers of Spain